Paintal is an Indian surname. "Paintal" (Gotra) is a sub-surname of Ahluwalias amongst Sikhs. Persons having this surname include:

 Paintal (comedian) (born 1948), Indian comedian
 Autar Singh Paintal (1925–2004), Indian scientist
 Gufi Paintal, Indian actor
 Hiten Paintal (born 1978), Indian actor
 Priti Paintal (born 1960), Indian composer, performer, music producer and promoter in England

See also
 Pental (disambiguation)

Indian surnames
Surnames of Indian origin
Punjabi-language surnames
Ahluwalia
Sikh names